Tunel railway station is a railway station in the former village of Tunel, near Miechów, in the Lesser Poland Voivodeship, Poland. The station opened in 1885 and is located on the Warsaw–Kraków railway and Tunel–Sosnowiec railway. The train services are operated by Przewozy Regionalne and Koleje Małopolskie.

Currently, the area of the village is incorporated into another village, Uniejów-Rędziny, part of Miechów County. However, the station located at one end of a rail tunnel still bears the name Tunel. The tunnel, after which the village was named, is 768 metres long, and was built in 1934 under the Biala Gora hill. The station of Tunel is a main rail junction, where lines go into three directions - towards Warsaw, Kraków, and Katowice.

Train services
The station is served by the following services:

Regional services (R) Kielce - Sędziszów - Kozłów - Bukowno - Dąbrowa Górnicza - Sosnowiec - Katowice
Regional services (R) Ostrowiec Świętokrzyski - Skarżysko-Kamienna - Kielce - Sędziszów - Kozłów - Miechów - Kraków
Regional services (KMŁ) Kielce - Sędziszów - Kozłów - Miechów - Kraków

References

 Description of the station
 This article is based upon a translation of the Polish language version as of November 2016.

External links 
 Photo of the Tunel station

Uniejow-Redziny
Railway stations in Lesser Poland Voivodeship
Railway stations in Poland opened in 1885